= Siby Ginette Bellegarde =

Malian politician

Siby Ginette Bellegarde (born 25 January 1949) is a Malian politician, born in Martinique (insular region of France located in the Lesser Antilles in the eastern Caribbean Sea).

== Biography ==
Ginette Siby Bellegarde attended primary and secondary school in Fort-de-France. After completing a university degree in higher education in Fort-de-France, she pursued graduate studies at the University Paris XI-Orsay in France, where she obtained a master's degree in chemistry and advanced studies diploma (DEA) in metallurgy in 1975, followed by a doctorate.

Bellegarde worked as a teacher of chemistry at Rosso High School (Mauritania), Marcory (Ivory Coast) and Bamako College (Mali). She served as General Director of the School of Advanced Practical Studies (now University Institute of Management in 1996), then Vice-Rector of the University of Mali in 2002 and finally Rector of the University in 2004. The ninth President of Mali, Amadou Toumani Toure appointed her Minister of Secondary, Higher Education and Scientific Research in the government of prime minister Modibo Sidibé'.

She was later appointed Minister of Higher Education and Scientific Research in the government of Cissé Mariam Kaïdama Sidibé.
